Urocotyledon norzilensis is a species of lizard in the family Gekkonidae. The species is endemic to Praslin in the Seychelles.

References

Urocotyledon
Geckos of Africa
Reptiles described in 2022